Pinole is a Mesoamerican food made from maize.

Pinole may also refer to:

 Pinole, California, an American city
 Pinole clover, Trifolium bifidum, a species of flowering plant
 Pinole Creek, a stream flowing into San Pablo Bay, California

See also
 Pinol, an Andean barley-based drink
 Pinolillo, a sweet cornmeal and cacao-based drink in Nicaragua
 Bank of Pinole, an historic building in Contra Costa County, California
 Pinole Tuff Formation, a geologic formation in California
 Rancho El Pinole, a Mexican land grant in present-day California